Vegas Stats & Information Network (VSiN) is an American sports betting radio network and streaming television channel. Founded in 2017 by the family of sportscaster Brent Musburger, VSIN broadcasts from their studios at the South Point Casino on the Las Vegas Strip, and the Circa Resort & Casino Sportsbook studios on Fremont Street in Las Vegas, Nevada.

VSiN programming is carried via its own website, as well as other over-the-top services. VSiN also syndicates its programming via local regional sports networks and radio stations, and is also available through Dish Network, packaged specifically with the channel suite of Racetrack Television Network.

History 
VSiN was launched in February 2017 by talent agent Brian Musburger, attorney Todd Musburger and documentary film producer Dave Berg. Broadcaster Brent Musburger joined VSiN as lead on-air personality after his January 2017 departure from ESPN. VSiN launched on February 5, 2017, with its first day of programming focusing on coverage of that day's Super Bowl LI.

Former Chicago Tribune Media executive Bill Adee was hired in March 2017 to be chief operating officer, followed by Fox Sports media executive Rick Jaffe, who was hired in May 2017, to be executive producer.

In March 2019, VSiN partnered with Anthem Sports & Entertainment to syndicate programming on its Canadian cable network Game+, including A Numbers Game on weekday mornings, and a weekly highlights program.

In February 2020, VSiN partnered with iHeartRadio to produce gambling-centric online broadcasts of XFL games. VSiN added a second main studio in October 2020 at the newly-opened Circa, with its construction occurring in parallel with the construction of the remainder of the building.

VSiN was carried on SiriusXM until December 31, 2020, with SportsGrid Radio replacing it in its channel allotment on January 7, 2021.

In March 2021, the Musburger family sold VSiN to DraftKings, with the Musburgers staying on in executive roles.

Personalities 
Brent Musburger serves as a lead on-air personality and host for its weekday program My Guys in the Desert, a reference to Musburger's long-time sly references to Nevada bookmakers during game broadcasts as his "friends in the desert".

Alongside Musburger, other on-air hosts employed by VSiN include Mitch Moss, Pauly Howard, Gill Alexander, Ron Flatter, Matt Youmans, Michael Lombardi, Jonathan Von Tobel, Tim Murray, Shaun King, Amal Shah, Patrick Meagher and Jeff Parles. VSiN also employs oddsmakers Jimmy Vaccaro, Vinny Magliulo and Chris Andrews to appear on its broadcasts.

References

External links 

Internet properties established in 2017
Gambling in the United States
Sirius XM Radio channels
Sports betting
Companies based in Las Vegas
2017 establishments in Nevada
2021 mergers and acquisitions